Cuproxena auga is a species of moth of the family Tortricidae. Its type locality is Curitiba, Paraná, Brazil, and its range includes parts of northern Argentina, Bolivia, and southeastern Brazil, including Bahia, Espírito Santo and Santa Catarina.

It was moved from the genus Dorithia to Cuproxena in 1991.

References

Moths described in 1990
Cuproxena
Moths of South America
Taxa named by Józef Razowski